The Inspector General of Police (IGP) is the most senior Police Officer in Ghana. The IGP is appointed by the President of Ghana acting in consultation with the Council of State. The IGP is the head of the Police service and is responsible for the operational control and the administration of the Police Service.

The IGP is a member of the Police Council. The first Ghanaian Police Commissioner, E. R. T. Madjitey was appointed to head the service on October 9, 1958. The IGP is aided by two deputies as well as nine directors and a Chief Staff Officer.

Following the retirement of B. A. Yakubu as the head of the Police service, the Progress Party government of Kofi Abrefa Busia appointed R. D. Ampaw, a lawyer civil servant as his successor. 

On 22 July 2019, Nana Akufo-Addo, President of Ghana asked David Asante-Apeatu to proceed on leave as the IGP. His deputy, James Oppong-Boanuh was asked to act as IGP until a substantive appointment was made. Asante-Apeatu was due to retire within a month. In August 2021 COP James Oppong-Boanuh was asked to also proceed on leave to make way for the new acting IGP who was later confirmed as the current IGP George Akuffo Dampare.

Inspectors General of Police of the Ghana Police Service

Heads of policing in the Gold Coast (1831–1893)
The following are the officials in charge of the organisation which eventually became the Ghana Police Service.
 Captain George Maclean 1831  –  1844, Administrator		 
 Chief Frank Gilbert, Governor 1844–1859
 Captain John Hawley Glover, Commander 1859– 
 Captain A. W. Baker, Inspector-General 1873–1876
 Sir Captain James Shaw Hay, Inspector-General	
 Alexander Grant
 Captain Bryden 
 Lt. Colonel Edward Bowater McInnis, CMG, Inspector-General 1886–1890

 Force under control of the Governor	1891 - 1893

Commissioner of Police (1893 - 1966)
The head of the Gold Coast Constabulary was the Commissioner of Police.
 Major A. W. Kitson, 1893  –  1910
 E. V. Collins, 1910  –  1917 COP/IGP
 Digby Rowland Albemarle Bettington 1917  –  1924 COP/IGP
 Lt. Col. H.W.M. Bamford OBE, MC, CBE  (27 August 1924 – 3 January 1938)
 Capt. Eric C. Nottingham MC (8 August 1938 – 21 May 1944)
 Capt. R.W.H. Ballantyne CBE (21 May 1944 – 18 August 1948)
 Capt. P. Eckel (18 August 1948 – 25 May 1949)
 Maj. M.K.N. Collens CMG, CBE (25 May 1949 – 31 December 1949)
 Arthur Lewin Alexander OBE (1 May 1958 – 8 October 1958)
 E.R.T. Madjitey CBE (9 October 1958 – 8 January 1964) - First Ghanaian Commissioner of Police
 John Willie Kofi Harlley MOV (1 January 1965 – 24 February 1966)

Inspector General of Police (1966 onwards)
 John Willie Kofi Harlley (MOV) - (25 February 1966  – 3 September 1969)
 Bawa Andani Yakubu (MOV) - (23 September 1969 – 12 June 1971)
 R. D. Ampaw - (14 June 1971 – 13 January 1972)
 J. H. Cobbina - (13 January 1972 – 29 September 1974)
 Ernest Ako CV - DSO (30 September 1974 – 7 July 1978)
 Benjamin Samuel Kofi Kwakye - DSG DSO (17 July 1978 – 4 June 1979)
 C. O. Lamptey - (5 June 1979 –  27 November 1979)
 F. P. Kyei - (27 November 1979 – 6 October 1981)
 R. K. Kugblenu - (6 October 1981 – 9 March 1984) 
 S. S. Omane - (9 March 1984 – 12 June 1986)
 Christopher Komla Dewornu - (12 June 1986  – 31 December 1989)
 J. Y. A Kwofie - (1 January 1990 – 30 September 1996)
 Peter Tenganabang Nanfuri - (1 October 1996 – 21 January 2001)
 Ernest Owusu-Poku - (22 January 2001 – 21 July 2001)
 Nana Owusu-Nsiah - (22 July 2001 – March 23 2005)
 Patrick Kwateng Acheampong - (25 March 2005 - 28 January 2009)
 Elizabeth Mills-Robertson (acting) from 28 January 2009
 Paul Tawiah Quaye - (16 May 2009 – 1 February 2013)
 Mohammed Ahmed Alhassan - (5 February 2013 - 9 November 2015)
 John Kudalor - (19 February 2016 - 25 January  2017)
 David Asante-Apeatu  from 25 January 2017 - 22 July 2019
James Oppong-Boanuh from October 2019 - 1 August 2021
George Akuffo Dampare effective 1 August 2021 - present

Notes and references

External links and sources
Ghana Police Service website
April 2006 - Journal of Security Sector Management
Photo Gallery of former IGPs

Police ranks
Police
Ghanaian police officers
Ghanaian Heads of Security Services